Roxbury is an unincorporated community located in the town of Roxbury, Dane County, Wisconsin, United States.

Gallery

Notes

Unincorporated communities in Dane County, Wisconsin
Unincorporated communities in Wisconsin